The following is a list of New Zealand sportspeople.

Basketball 
 Steven Adams – basketball player
 Pero Cameron – basketball player
 Sean Marks – basketball player
Dan Shamir (born 1975) - Israeli professional basketball coach, lives in Auckland

Golf 
 Michael Campbell – golfer
 Sir Bob Charles – champion golfer
 Lydia Ko - champion golfer
 Danny Lee - golfer
 Phil Tataurangi - golfer
 Steve Williams – caddy

Motorsports
 Chris Amon – Formula One and sports car driver
 Bruce Anstey - motorcycle road racer
 Brendon Hartley – Ex Formula One Driver and Two time WEC winner including 24 of Le mans Win 
 Possum Bourne – rally driving
 Barry Briggs - motorcycle speedway rider
 Nick Cassidy - Formula E Driver
 Simon Crafar - motorcycle road racer
 Graeme Crosby - motorcycle road racer
 Scott Dixon – Six-time IndyCar champion, 2008 Indy 500 Champion
 Mitch Evans - Formula E Driver
 Denny Hulme – 1967 Formula One champion
 Chris Lange - rally driver 
 Ivan Mauger – six-time motorcycle speedway world champion
 Bruce McLaren – Formula One and CanAm driver
 Scott McLaughlin - touring car driver, IndyCar Driver
 Stefan Merriman - enduro rider
 Steve Millen – sports car and off-road truck driver
 Burt Munro – motorcycle speedway and land speed record holder
 Greg Murphy – touring car driver
 Chris Pither – touring car driver
 Aaron Slight - motorcycle road racer
 Ben Townley - World Champion, Motocross
 Ted Tracey - Speedway racing driver 
 Shane van Gisbergen - touring car driver

Netball

Rugby league

Rugby union

Soccer

Cricket 
Main articles: List of New Zealand Test cricketers, List of New Zealand ODI cricketers, List of New Zealand Twenty20 International cricketers

See also:New Zealand national cricket team, New Zealand women's national cricket team

 Craig Auckram
 Brendon McCullum
 Kane Williamson
 Ross Taylor
 Richard Hadlee
 Shane Bond
 Martin Crowe
 Trent Boult
 Lockie Ferguson
 Tim Southee
 James Neesham
 Bradley-John Watling
 Ajaz Patel
 James Franklin
 Scott Styris
 Corey Anderson
 Tom Latham
 Colin de Grandhomme
 Jacob Oram
 Stephen Fleming
 Daniel Vettori
 Craig McMillan
 Liz Perry
 Shane Bond

Track and field
 Valerie Adams – shotputter, four-time Olympic Champion
 David Ambler – 100m, 200m sprints
 Anne Audain –  runner
 Hamish Carter – triathlete
 Rod Dixon – runner
 Murray Halberg – runner
 Jack Lovelock – runner
 Arthur Lydiard – running coach
 Lorraine Moller – runner, won Boston Marathon
 Eliza McCartney - pole vaulter, Olympic bronze medallist
 Dick Quax – runner
 Allison Roe – runner, won Boston and New York City Marathons 1981
 Peter Snell – runner, three times Olympic Champion
 John Walker – runner, Olympic champion
 Nick Willis – runner, Commonwealth champion, Olympic silver medallist
 John Young - ultra distance runner; first person to run from Wellington to Auckland 1962 and Bluff to Cape Reinga 1964; first person to run across the Nulabhour Plain in Australia 1968

Watersports
 Jo Aleh – world champion and Olympic champion sailor
 Sir Peter Blake – yachtsman
 Trent Bray – world champion swimmer
 Nathan Cohen - world champion and Olympic champion rower
 Russell Coutts – yachtsman, Olympic Champion
 Caroline Evers-Swindell - champion rower
 Georgina Evers-Swindell - champion rower
 Ian Ferguson – kayaker
 Danyon Loader – double olympic champion swimmer
 Jonathan Winter – world champion swimmer

Miscellaneous
Margaret Jane Briggs, show-ring rider
Christine Jensen Burke – mountaineer
Helen Clarke - field hockey player
Cheree Crowley – professional wrestler
Dame Susan Devoy - squash player
 Bob Fitzsimmons – world boxing heavyweight champion (born in UK, raised in NZ)
 Tom Fyfe – mountaineer and mountain guide
 Tony Garea – former WWWF/WWF professional wrestler
 Sir Edmund Hillary – mountaineer
 Mark Hunt - mixed martial artist
 Precious McKenzie – weightlifter (born in South Africa)
 Mark Todd – equestrian
 Sarah Ulmer – cyclist
 Michael Walker – jockey
 Sarah Walker – BMX rider
 Tony Wilding – tennis player

References

 Sportspeople